Jane's Combat Simulations was a brand of PC flight and combat flight simulators released by Electronic Arts (EA). The Jane's Information Group branding was licensed by Electronic Arts to lend authenticity and accuracy to their growing line of combat games. The license was announced in 1995, and games were released over the next 5 years, although Jane's Combat Simulations branded games had been released by Electronic Arts since 1994. In late 2000, Electronic Arts dropped Jane's Combat Simulations, leading to them being licensed by different companies.

The creative leads behind the Jane's Combat Simulations line were Andy Hollis and Paul Grace, designers who previously worked on games such as F-19 Stealth Fighter and Chuck Yeager's Advanced Flight Trainer.

U.S. Navy Fighters is a predecessor game to the franchise. It was released in 1994 by Electronic Arts as part of the Air Combat series. An updated version, Jane's US Navy Fighters 97, was released in 1996 that was officially part of the franchise.

Games
 Jane's Combat Simulations: Advanced Tactical Fighters (1996) DOS
 Jane's Combat Simulations: Advanced Tactical Fighters - Nato Fighters (1996) DOS
 Jane's Combat Simulations: AH-64D Longbow (1996) DOS
 Jane's Combat Simulations: AH-64D Longbow: Flash Point Korea (1996) DOS
 Jane's Combat Simulations: U.S. Navy Fighters '97 (1996) Windows
 Jane's Combat Simulations - 688(I) Hunter/Killer (1997) Windows 
 Jane's Combat Simulations: Longbow 2 (1997) Windows
 Jane's Combat Simulations: WWII Fighters (1998) Windows
 Jane's Combat Simulations: F-15 (1998) Windows
 Jane's Combat Simulations: Israeli Air Force (1998) Windows
 Jane's Combat Simulations: Fleet Command (1999) Windows
 Jane's Combat Simulations: USAF (1999) Windows
 Jane's Combat Simulations: F/A-18 (2000) Windows

Game collections
 Jane's Combat Simulations: Advanced Tactical Fighters Gold (1997) Windows
 Jane's Combat Simulations: Longbow Gold (1997) DOS, Windows
 Jane's Combat Simulations: Fighters Anthology (1997) Windows
 Jane's Combat Simulations: Longbow Anthology (1998) DOS, Windows
 Jane's Combat Simulations: Attack Pack (1998) DOS, Windows
 Jane's Combat Simulations: Air Superiority Collection (2000) Windows
 Jane's Combat Simulations: Naval Warfare Collection (2000) Windows

Games without original developer involvement
 Jane's Attack Squadron (2002) Windows
 JASF: Jane's Advanced Strike Fighters (2011) Windows

References

External links
Jane's Combat Simulations at MobyGames

 
Electronic Arts games
Electronic Arts franchises
Combat flight simulators